Manoel Cristiano Ribeiro Lemes (born 1 February 1989), simply known as Manoel, is a Brazilian footballer who plays as a forward for EC Vitória.

Club career
After playing with clubs like Penafiel and Gremio, Manoel joined Braga in a free transfer.

His debut for the Portuguese team was in a Taca de Portugal match against  Pampilhosa where he was substituted in 90+3 minutes.

Honours
Braga
Portuguese League Cup: 2012-13

Altos
 Campeonato Piauiense: 2017,2018 e 2021

References

Brazilian footballers
Brazilian expatriate footballers
1989 births
Living people
Association football forwards
S.C. Braga players
S.C. Braga B players
Associação Académica de Coimbra – O.A.F. players
FC Gloria Buzău players
F.C. Penafiel players
Boa Esporte Clube players
Sociedade Imperatriz de Desportos players
Brasiliense Futebol Clube players
Campeonato Brasileiro Série B players
Campeonato Brasileiro Série C players
Campeonato Brasileiro Série D players
Primeira Liga players
Liga Portugal 2 players
Brazilian expatriate sportspeople in Portugal
Expatriate footballers in Portugal